Fifth Edition or 5th Edition may refer to:

Dungeons & Dragons 5th edition
Fifth Edition (Magic: The Gathering)
Fifth edition of the IPL